LRP can refer to:
 Lateralized readiness potential, an electrophysiological brain response
 Layerwise Relevance Propagation, a method for understanding how artificial neural networks work
 Lead replacement petrol
 League for the Revolutionary Party
 The Linux Router Project
 Lipoprotein receptor-related proteins
 Lithuanian Regions Party
 Live action role-playing game
 Living free-radical polymerization
 Livestock risk protection, a type of crop insurance for livestock growers
 Long Range Patrol (disambiguation), military units that operate behind enemy lines
 LRP ration, a lightweight military food ration
 Lower riser package, for well intervention on a subsea oil well
Long-range plan, business forecast